Calvia Crispinilla (fl. c. 70) was a Roman Imperial courtier.

Life
Calvia Crispinilla was possibly of African origins. She was a favourite of the emperor Nero, serving as "mistress of the Imperial wardrobe" at the palace. A noblewoman of unknown lineage, she was considered to have great power and influence, having accompanied Nero and his third wife Statilia Messalina to Greece in 66. She was seen as greedy and rapacious by her contemporaries. Tacitus called Calvia Crispinilla a "tutor in vice" (magistrate libidinum) of Nero. When Nero married the young castrated boy Sporus in 67, he made her the "mistress of wardrobe" of Sporus (epitropeia ten peri estheta).

By 68–69, after changing her political associations, Crispinilla was said to have been the instigator of the unsuccessful revolt of Lucius Clodius Macer in Africa. She was subsequently credited with being behind the defection of Galba from Nero.

After Nero's death, Calvia Crispinilla married a former consul.  Her first husband might have been the Sextus Traulus Montanus whom Claudius executed in AD 48, as a number of ceramic wares have been found combining the names of Traulus and Crispinilla.  During Otho's brief period as emperor there was a public outcry for her execution, but Otho seems to have protected her, and she survived unscathed.

Calvia Crispinilla was also active within commerce, and enjoyed success with her investments in the lucrative wine trade.

Historical evidence
Several olive oil amphorae have been recovered from Poetovio in the Adriatic region, bearing stamps with her name or Calvia and Traulus Montanus together. Two of her slaves, Camulus and Quietus, are attested by a surviving inscription near Tarentum.

Bibliography
 Tacitus, Annals, xvi. Appendix viii
 Dio Cassius, Roman History 62.12.3–4

References

1st-century births
1st-century deaths
1st-century Roman women
Nero
Ancient businesswomen
Courtiers
Royal favourites
Ancient Roman businesspeople